Daniel J. Burke (born December 17, 1951) was a Democratic member of the Illinois House of Representatives, representing the 23rd district from 1991 to 2013 and the 1st district from 2013 to 2018. Burke was defeated for the Democratic nomination in 2018 primary by Aaron Ortiz. Burke resigned from the House on December 30, 2018.

Daniel Burke is the brother of Chicago Alderman Ed Burke.

References

External links
Representative Daniel J. Burke (D) 23rd District at the Illinois General Assembly
By session: 99th, 98th, 97th, 96th, 95th, 94th, 93rd
 
Daniel J. Burke at Illinois House Democrats

Democratic Party members of the Illinois House of Representatives
1951 births
Living people
Politicians from Chicago
21st-century American politicians
Burke family